Haren railway station may refer to 
Haren (Ems) station in Germany
Haren (NL) railway station in the Netherlands
Haren railway station (Brussels) in Belgium

See also
 Haren-South railway station, Brussels